Aurabela "Belita" Moreno (born November 1, 1949) is an American actress best known for her roles as Benita "Benny" Lopez on the ABC sitcom George Lopez and Edwina Twinkacetti and Lydia Markham on Perfect Strangers.

Early life
Aurabela Moreno was born in Dallas, Texas, to mother, Aurora Rodriguez, a high school Spanish teacher, and father, Abel Moreno, a World War II veteran. Moreno graduated from Justin F. Kimball High School, and went on to major in Theatre at Southern Methodist University. She continued her acting studies at the Pacific Conservatory of the Performing Arts in Santa Maria, California, where she appeared in the musical Once Upon a Mattress. Moreno is married to Joel Rudnick, a talent agent. The couple have two children.

Career
Soon after Moreno arrived in Hollywood, California, to pursue her acting career, she met director Robert Altman, and landed roles in three of his films: 3 Women, A Wedding, and A Perfect Couple. She appeared in many other films, including Mommie Dearest, Swing Shift, Oh, God! You Devil, Nobody's Fool, Men Don't Leave, Clear and Present Danger and Grosse Pointe Blank.

Moreno was a regular on the long-running ABC sitcom Perfect Strangers from 1986 to 1992. Her work on television includes appearances in television movies, such as Crazy From the Heart and Death Benefit, the miniseries Tales of the City, and in numerous sitcoms and dramatic series, including The Golden Girls, Family Ties, Valerie and Melrose Place. Moreno played Benny Lopez, George Lopez's mother, on George Lopez (2002–07).

During the 1980s, Moreno was a favorite of Pulitzer Prize-winning playwright Beth Henley. Moreno performed in at least four premieres of Henley's plays. Henley created several roles specifically for Moreno: "Popeye" in The Miss Firecracker Contest, some dialogue of which was based on a true story told to the playwright by Moreno, and "Lacey Rollins" in the two-act play The Lucky Spot. Moreno performed in Firecracker at the Victory Theater in Burbank, California in 1980, and in Lucky Spot off-Broadway at the Manhattan Theatre Club in 1987.

Moreno also appeared in Henley's 1982 Broadway premiere at the Eugene O'Neill Theater of The Wake of Jamey Foster as "Katty Foster", directed by Ulu Grosbard, and in the 1989 world premiere of Abundance, as "Macon" at the South Coast Repertory in Costa Mesa, California.

Since the early 1990s, Moreno has served as an acting coach and advisor on numerous films, such as Jerry Maguire, Rush Hour 2, Almost Famous, Parent Trap, The Family Man, Crossroads and 17 Again. She also appeared on Wizards of Waverly Place on Disney and Fairly Legal on USA Network.

Filmography

Film

Television

References

External links

 
 Belita Moreno profile at Starpulse.com
 Date of birth of Belita Moreno confirmed as November 1, 1949 at Texas Births, 1926-1995. Family Tree Legends Records Collection (Online Database). Pearl Street Software, 2004-2005

1949 births
Living people
American stage actresses
American film actresses
American television actresses
American actresses of Mexican descent
Actresses from Dallas
Southern Methodist University alumni
20th-century American actresses
21st-century American actresses